Pachnephorus danielssoni is a species of leaf beetle found in Sierra Leone, Senegal and the Democratic Republic of the Congo, described by Stefano Zoia in 2007. It is named after Roy Danielssoni, who collected and examined material for the species.

Subspecies
There are two subspecies of P. danielssoni:

 Pachnephorus danielssoni danielssoni Zoia, 2007: The nominotypical subspecies. Found in Sierra Leone and Senegal.
 Pachnephorus danielssoni congoanus Zoia, 2007: Found in the Democratic Republic of the Congo. The subspecies name refers to the country where the subspecies was collected.

References

Eumolpinae
Beetles of Africa
Insects of West Africa
Beetles of the Democratic Republic of the Congo
Beetles described in 2007